Pierrefitte-sur-Seine (literally Pierrefitte on Seine) is a commune in the Seine-Saint-Denis department and Île-de-France region of France.

Heraldry

History
In December 2005, Pierrefitte became Europe's first "Mediation Town".

Population

Transport
The town is served by Pierrefitte – Stains railway station on line D of the RER regional suburban rail network.

The south of the commune, where the National Archives of France relocated in 2013, is also served by Saint-Denis – Université station on Paris Métro Line 13. This station lies on the border between the communes of Pierrefitte-sur-Seine and Saint-Denis.

Education
Primary and secondary schools in the commune include:
 Nine preschools (maternelles)
 Eight elementary schools
 Two junior high schools: Collège Gustave-Courbet and Collège Pablo-Neruda
Collège intercommunal Lucie-Aubrac in Villetaneuse also serves Pierrefitte students, as does Lycée Polyvalent Maurice-Utrillo, a senior high school/sixth-form college in Stains.

Paris 8 University and Paris 13 University serve area students.

In the arts
Pierrefitte was where comedian and filmmaker Kheiron was raised, and the setting for his award-winning film All Three of Us.

Personalities
The actor and playwright Frédérick Lemaître lived in Pierrefitte between 1830 and 1845.
The naturalist Alcide d'Orbigny died in Pierrefitte in 1857 and is buried in the municipal cemetery.

Twin towns
Pierrefitte is twinned with
Braintree in the United Kingdom
Rüdersdorf bei Berlin in Germany.

See also
Communes of the Seine-Saint-Denis department

References

External links

Official web portal of the town of Pierrefitte-sur-Seine  

Communes of Seine-Saint-Denis